Port Loring Water Aerodrome  is located  southwest of Port Loring, Ontario, Canada.

See also
Arnstein Airport
Smoky Lake Water Aerodrome

References

Registered aerodromes in Ontario
Seaplane bases in Ontario